Leaf class may refer to:

Leaf morphology, the classification of leaves by shape
Leaf class (programming language), a class that should not be subclassed
Leaf class tanker, a class of support tanker of the British Royal Fleet Auxiliary